Bombylius mexicanus is a species of bee flies in the family Bombyliidae.

References

Further reading

External links

 

Bombyliidae
Insects described in 1821